Eva Pfarrhofer (29 May 1928 – 3 May 2017) was an Austrian diver. She competed at the 1952 Summer Olympics and the 1956 Summer Olympics.

References

External links
 
 

1928 births
2017 deaths
Austrian female divers
Olympic divers of Austria
Divers at the 1952 Summer Olympics
Divers at the 1956 Summer Olympics
Divers from Vienna